The Southern Africa Cat Council (SACC) is a cat registry and cat fancy organisation based in South Africa, affiliating 9 clubs, 14 breed groups and 4 judges panels.

History
SACC was founded in 1945 as the Associated Cat Clubs of South Africa, the first organisation serving the South African cat fancy. 

In 1996, the members overhauled the organisation's structure and constitution, and adopted the name Southern African Cat Council.

SACC joined the World Cat Congress in 2006.

References

External links
Official Website
Cat Paw Corns
Cat Accessories

Cat registries
Clubs and societies in South Africa
Organizations established in 1945
1945 establishments in South Africa